The Onslow Gilmore House is a historic house at 477 Main Street in Stoneham, Massachusetts.  Built about 1875, it is one of the few surviving Italianate houses of many that once lined Main Street south of Central Square. It was listed on the National Register of Historic Places in 1984.  It now houses professional offices.

Description and history
The Onslow Gilmore House stands on the west side of Main Street (Massachusetts Route 28), between Linden and Gerry Street.  Just to its south stands the nearly identical Clara Buswell House.  It is a -story wood-frame structure, with an L-shaped floorplan that includes a porch in the crook of the L.  Although the house has been resided, it has retained some of its Italianate detailing on the porch and front bay window.  The porch is supported by bracket square posts, with valance-like woodwork between them, and the front-facing polygonal bay window has a cornice decorated with paired brackets. Narrow round-arch windows, also a typical Italianate feature, are found in the gables, and the building retains its slate roof.  The house lot also retains original stone curbing and posts at the sidewalk edges on both Main and Linden Streets.

The house was built by Onslow Gilmore, a local businessman involved in real estate, insurance, and banking.  Houses similar to these were built in large numbers on Main Street after the American Civil War; this house and the Buswell House two are among the few that survive.

See also
National Register of Historic Places listings in Stoneham, Massachusetts
National Register of Historic Places listings in Middlesex County, Massachusetts

References

Houses in Stoneham, Massachusetts
Houses on the National Register of Historic Places in Stoneham, Massachusetts
Italianate architecture in Massachusetts
Houses completed in 1875